Notospermus is a genus of nemertine worms that includes marine species. Genus contains the following species:

Notospermus albovittatus Stimpson, 1855
Notospermus geniculatus Delle Chiaje, 1828
Notospermus tricuspidatus Quoy & Gaimard, 1833

References 

 Gibson, R. (2001). Nemertini (Nemertae), in: Costello, M.J. et al. (Ed.) (2001). European register of marine species: a check-list of the marine species in Europe and a bibliography of guides to their identification. Collection Patrimoines Naturels, 50: pp. 152-156
  Gibson, R. (2005). Nemertina DB. Liverpool John Moore University, UK.

Lineidae
Nemertea genera